The TEAN International was a professional tennis tournament played on outdoor clay courts. It was part of the Association of Tennis Professionals (ATP) Challenger Tour and the ITF Women's Circuit, held annually at the Alphense Tennis Club in Alphen aan den Rijn, Netherlands from 1996 to 2017.

Past finals

Men's singles

Men's doubles

Women's singles

Women's doubles

References

External links
Official website
ITF search

 
ATP Challenger Tour
ITF Women's World Tennis Tour
Hard court tennis tournaments
Tennis tournaments in the Netherlands
Recurring sporting events established in 2001
Sports competitions in South Holland
Sport in Alphen aan den Rijn
Recurring sporting events disestablished in 2017
Defunct sports competitions in the Netherlands